Dharwad city is one of the most important cities in terms of education in the state of Karnataka, A large number of students from different parts of India and a few hundreds of students from foreign countries live and study here. Dharwad is known as the education hub of Karnataka.

Universities
 Karnatak University, Dharwad
 Karnataka State Law University (KSLU), Hubballi
 University of Agricultural Sciences, Dharwad
National Forensic Sciences University, Dharwad

Medical, Health Science & Physical Education Universities
 Karnataka Institute of Medical Sciences(KIMS), Hubballi
 KLE University's College of Pharmacy, Hubballi
 SDM College of Medical Sciences, Dharwad
 Sri Dharmasthala Manjunatheshwara College of Dental Sciences, Dharwad

Engineering, Polytechnic & Industrial Training colleges

 BVB College of Engineering & Technology, Hubballi
 SDM College of Engineering and Technology, Dharwad
 Indian Institute of Information Technology Dharwada (IIIT Dharwad), Dharwada (U/C)
 Indian Institute of Technology Dharwada (IIT Dharwad), Dharwada
 Nettur Technical Training Foundation(NTTF), Dharwad
 Nalanda Polytechnic, Hubballi
 St.John's Polytechnic, Hubballi

Arts, Commerce & General Science Colleges

 Empower PU Science College, Dharwad
 JSS Banashankari Arts, Commerce & S.K.Gubbi Science College, Dharwad
 Karnatak College, Dharwad
 P.C. Jabin Science College, Hubballi
 Presim science PU College
 Kittle college, Jubilee Circle
St Joseph's Science and commerce college, Jubilee Circle
Hanchinmani Science PU College
Karnataka Science College

Post Graduate Colleges & Management Schools
 Kousali Institute of Management Studies
 Chetan Business School, Institute of Management & Research, Hubballi
 Sana College of Information Science & Management

References 

Dharwad